Brian Lenney is an American politician serving as a member of the Idaho Senate for the 13th district. He assumed office on December 1, 2022.

Early life and education 
Lenney was born in Corona, California. He earned an associate degree from Riverside City College in 2002, a Bachelor of Arts degree from the University of North Dakota in 2007, and a Master of Arts from Biola University in 2010.

Career 

From 2015 to 2018, Lenney worked as a copywriter for HubSpot and Lurn Inc. He also wrote columns for Townhall. From 2018 to 2022, Lenney worked as a senior copywriter and marketing manager for Millionaire Publishing. Lenney is also the author of Why is Feminism So Silly?: A Guide for Kids and Why Everyone Needs an AR-15!: A Guide for Kids. He was elected to the Idaho Senate in November 2022.

References 

Living people
Idaho Republicans
People from Corona, California
People from Riverside County, California
People from Nampa, Idaho
People from Canyon County, Idaho
University of North Dakota alumni
Biola University alumni
Riverside City College alumni
Year of birth missing (living people)